Second Life is a 2009 Portuguese movie directed by Miguel Gaudêncio and produced by Alexandre Valente. It stars Piotr Adamczyk, Lúcia Moniz, Pedro Lima, Paulo Pires and Sandra Cóias. It was the second highest-grossing Portuguese film in 2009.

External links

References 

2009 films
Films shot in the Algarve